Abdullah Al-Alimi Bawazeer (born 1979) is a Yemeni politician and member of the Yemeni Presidential Leadership Council. Abdullah was born in Bayhan, Shabwah governorate.

He served as director of the office of former president Abdrabbuh Mansur Hadi since 8 November 2016. Abdullah was considered one of President Hadi’s inner circle. He is also a member of the Al-Islah party.

Qualifications 

 Bachelor's degree in Medicine from the University of Aden
 Bachelor's degree in Sharia and Law from the University of Science and Technology
 MA in Management and Economics from the University of Malaysia
 PhD in Sharia and Law from the University of Aden

Careers 

 Professor at the University of Aden
 Head of the Department of Local Authority and Civil Society Organizations in the Office of the Yemeni Presidency, 2012
 Deputy Director of the Office of the Yemeni Presidency, 2015
 Director of the Office of the Yemeni Presidency, 2016
 Member of the Yemeni Presidential Leadership Council, 2022

References 

1979 births
Living people
People from Shabwah Governorate
Presidential Leadership Council
21st-century Yemeni politicians
University of Aden alumni